Lodi Township was a township that existed in Bergen County, New Jersey, United States, from 1826 to 1935.

History
Lodi Township was formed by an act of the New Jersey Legislature, on March 1, 1826, from the southern portion of New Barbadoes Township.

On February 22, 1840, Hudson County was created from territories that had been Bergen Township (1693) and from the southern portion of Lodi Township. The portion of Lodi Township taken at this time formed the new Harrison Township in Hudson County. The border between the newly created Harrison Township in Hudson County and the portion of Lodi Township remaining in Bergen County was the New Barbadoes Turnpike, which is now called Paterson Plank Road.

In 1852, some of the residents of the northern portion of Harrison Township requested to be returned to Bergen County. This area—which had been part of Lodi Township—was returned to Bergen County as Union Township.

On February 21, 1893, Bergen Township was created from the southern section of Lodi Township.

In 1894, with "Boroughitis" at its peak, the subdivision of Lodi Township kicked off with the creation of three boroughs: Hasbrouck Heights (July 31, 1894), Little Ferry (September 18, 1894) and Lodi (December 21, 1894). Moonachie was created on April 11, 1910, followed by Teterboro on March 26, 1917. During this period, several exchanges of territory were made with neighboring municipalities.

Lodi Township sewer scandal
Finally, on November 15, 1935, Lodi Township was dissolved and the remaining scattered fragments of the township became South Hackensack. The immediate cause of this was the "Lodi Township sewer scandal" of 1930, allegedly a corrupt municipal contract to build a sewer where there were, as yet, no streets. State Senator Ralph W. Chandless was expelled from the New Jersey State Senate as a result of his role in this scandal. The campaign to expose the scandal and those involved in it, including Chandless, was led by The Bergen Evening Record of Hackensack, later The Bergen Record and now The Record of Hackensack.

Arguably the sewer, built mainly along what is now Green Street, was a sensible idea intended to attract commercial and industrial development. Due to the Great Depression development did not take place until after World War II.

The sewer line in question still exists in South Hackensack. Manhole covers along Green Street with the legend "Lodi Towns 1929" may still be seen.

Notable residents
Notable residents of Lodi Township include:
 John Huyler (1808–1870), represented  in the United States House of Representatives from 1857 to 1859.

References

Sources
 Municipal Incorporations of the State of New Jersey (according to Counties) prepared by the Division of Local Government, Department of the Treasury (New Jersey); December 1, 1958.
 Clayton, W. Woodford; and Nelson, William. History of Bergen and Passaic Counties, New Jersey, with Biographical Sketches of Many of its Pioneers and Prominent Men. Philadelphia: Everts and Peck, 1882.
 Harvey, Cornelius Burnham (ed.), Genealogical History of Hudson and Bergen Counties, New Jersey. New York: New Jersey Genealogical Publishing Co., 1900.
 Van Valen, James M. History of Bergen County, New Jersey. New York: New Jersey Publishing and Engraving Co., 1900.
 Westervelt, Frances A. (Frances Augusta), 1858–1942, History of Bergen County, New Jersey, 1630–1923, Lewis Historical Publishing Company, 1923.

Former townships in Bergen County, New Jersey
Geography of Bergen County, New Jersey
South Hackensack, New Jersey
1826 establishments in New Jersey